Kansas Day is a holiday in the state of Kansas in the United States. It is celebrated annually on January 29 to commemorate the anniversary of the state's 1861 admission to the Union. It was first celebrated in 1877 by schoolchildren in Paola.

Annual Kansas Day celebrations include school field trips and special projects to study the history of Kansas, pioneer-style meals, special visits by students to the Kansas Statehouse in Topeka, Kansas, performances of Home on the Range, the Kansas State Song, and special proclamations by the Governor of Kansas and members of the Kansas Legislature.

The Sunflower Showdown basketball game between the Kansas Jayhawks and the Kansas State Wildcats is occasionally played on or around Kansas Day to celebrate the state's history.

References

External links 
Kansas Day
Kansas Day at the Statehouse

Secular holidays
January observances
State holidays in the United States
1877 establishments in Kansas
Populated places established in 1877
Annual events in Kansas